The 1936 Manukau by-election was a by-election during the 25th New Zealand Parliament in the  electorate. It was held on Wednesday 30 September 1936. This by-election came about because of the resignation of Bill Jordan upon his appointment to the position of High Commissioner to the UK during the term of the 25th New Zealand Parliament. The by-election in the  electorate was contested by Arthur Osborne for Labour and Frederick Doidge for National, with Osborne winning the election.

Background and candidates
A by-election was triggered due to Bill Jordan's resignation upon his appointment to the post of High Commissioner to the United Kingdom.

Labour
The Labour party chose Arthur Osborne as their candidate for the seat.

The unsuccessful nominees for the Labour candidacy were Mary Dreaver, Alec Monteith and James Purtell.

National
The newly created National Party chose Frederick Doidge as their contestant for the seat. In the 1935 election, Doidge ran as an Independent in the  electorate, despite briefly courting the anti-Labour Democrat Party. Of the four candidates, he came second after Labour's Alexander Moncur. As a new party this was National's first real electoral test to see if the unification of the United, Reform & Democrat parties would be able to combat Labour more effectively.

Results
The following table contains the results of the by-election:

Notes

References 

Manukau 1936
1936 elections in New Zealand
Politics of the Auckland Region